The 2018 Malaysia FAM League was the 67th season of the Malaysia FAM League since its establishment in 1952. The season started on 25 February 2018 and concluded on 6 September 2018. Sime Darby were the defending champions. The season marked the competition's final year as the third tier football league in Malaysia when it was succeeded by the Malaysia M3 League for the 2019 season.

Teams
For the 2018 season, 14 teams competed in the league, including nine sides from the 2017 season, two relegated sides from the 2017 Malaysia Premier League and three new teams.

 Armed Forces (relegated from the 2017 Malaysia Premier League)
 D'AR Wanderers (New Team)
 Kuala Lumpur City Hall
 Terengganu Hanelang
 Kuching
 Marcerra United (New Team)
 Ministry of Finance
 MPKB
 Selangor United
 Perlis (relegated from the 2017 Malaysia Premier League)
 Petaling Jaya Rangers 
 Shahzan Muda 
 Terengganu City
 Young Fighters (New Team)

Season Changes

( Promoted to the 2018 Malaysia Premier League )
 FELCRA 1
 UKM

From the Malaysia Premier League
( Relegated from the 2017 Malaysia Premier League )
 ATM
 Perlis

Teams withdrawn
 KDMM
 Penjara
 SAMB
 Sime Darby 1

 1 Originally Sime Darby F.C. were promoted along with UKM F.C. as finalists of the 2017 Malaysia FAM League final, but after Sime Darby announced their withdrawal from participation in the Malaysia Premier League , Felcra F.C., the next highest team in the Malaysia FAM League table, were invited as their replacement.

Teams, locations and stadia

Stadium and locations

Personnel and sponsoring

League stages

League table 
From this season, only the top two teams from each group qualify for the knockout round.

Group A

Group B2

 2Marcerra United and Hanelang's results were expunged from the table as a result of the teams' withdrawals from the league on 20 July 2018 and 25 July 2018 respectively.

Fixtures and results

Fixtures and Results of the 2018 Malaysia FAM League season.

Group A

Matchday 1

Matchday 2

Matchday 3

Matchday 4

Matchday 5

Matchday 6

Matchday 7

Matchday 8

Matchday 9

Matchday 10

Matchday 11

Matchday 12

Matchday 13

Matchday 14

Group B

Matchday 1

Matchday 2

Matchday 3

Matchday 4

Matchday 5

Matchday 6

Matchday 7

Matchday 8

Matchday 9

Matchday 10

Matchday 11

Matchday 12

Matchday 13

Matchday 14

322 and 23 April 2018 marked the first time in the season two teams played twice in a twenty-four hour period. Adverse weather conditions halted an afternoon match between ATM FA and MOF F.C. on 22 April. The game resumed at 9 am the following morning, and ATM won 1–0.

Knock-out stage 
The teams that won in the semi-final stage will be promoted to the 2019 Malaysia Premier League.

Semi-finals

First Leg

Second leg

2−2 on aggregate. Terengganu City won on away goals.

Selangor United won 4−3 on aggregate.

Finals

Season statistics

Hat-tricks

Notes:
(H) – Home ; (A) – Away

See also 
 2018 Malaysia Super League
 2018 Malaysia Premier League
 2018 Malaysia FA Cup
 2018 Malaysia Cup
 2018 Piala Presiden
 2018 Piala Belia
 List of Malaysian football transfers 2018

References

External links
 Football Association of Malaysia website - FAM League

5
2018